Amomum exertum is a species in the ginger family, Zingiberaceae. It was first described by Benedetto Scortechini and renamed by Skornick. & Hlavatá.

References

External links

Alpinioideae